Keith Dublin (born 29 January 1966) is an English former footballer who played at left-back for Chelsea, Brighton & Hove Albion, Watford, Southend United and Colchester United in the Football League.

Career

Born in High Wycombe, Dublin began his career with Chelsea, one of the first black footballers to play for the club. Dublin came to Chelsea as an apprentice in July 1982,signed  professional in October 1983, and made his debut for the Chelsea first team in May 1984 against Barnsley in the Second Division Championship side managed by John Neal. Despite being voted Chelsea's young player of the year in 1983, he struggled to hold down a place in the first team and when left-sided players Tony Dorigo and Clive Wilson were signed in 1987, he was sold to Brighton & Hove Albion for £35,000.

He was a member of the Brighton side which won promotion to the old Second Division, before enjoying spells with Watford, Southend United, Colchester United, and in non-league football with Farnborough Town and Carshalton Athletic.

Honours

Club
Brighton & Hove Albion
 Football League Third Division runner-up: 1987–88

Individual
PFA Team of the Year: 1987–88 Third Division

References

External links
 
 

1966 births
Living people
Sportspeople from High Wycombe
English footballers
Association football defenders
Chelsea F.C. players
Brighton & Hove Albion F.C. players
Colchester United F.C. players
Southend United F.C. players
Watford F.C. players
Farnborough F.C. players
Carshalton Athletic F.C. players
Tooting & Mitcham United F.C. players
English Football League players
National League (English football) players
Footballers from Buckinghamshire